Jesús Ramón Ramírez Ceceña (born 5 December 1969) is a Mexican former professional footballer who played as a midfielder. He is one of the all-time most capped players for the Mexico national football team.

Ramírez was meant to be one of the best Mexican players since Hugo Sánchez, but various injuries threatened and stopped his career several times. He was one of the top Mexican footballers in the 1990s, but despite the speculations surrounding his talents, he never moved to Europe to play for a much more competitive club.

Club career

Ramirez started his career in Santos Laguna in 1990, and since the beginning, he showed his skills in the midfield. His talent made him one of the most promising players of the time, and was rewarded with a call for the Mexico national football team in 1991.

In the 1991–1992 season, in a match against America, Carlos Alberto "El Escorpión" Carrillo, a defender of that team fractured his tibia and fibula. This caused him to miss the Barcelona 1992 Olympic Games with the Mexico team, and a lack of form after the physical recovery. He managed come back after several months, to continue with brilliant displays with Santos Laguna, and in 1993, he recovered his spot in the national team. He played with Santos Laguna until 1994, year in which he played the final of the Mexican tournament, which he lost against Tecos UAG.

His performance in the international tournaments in which Mexico national team participated, attracted the attention of several teams, and in 1994 (after he played in the final with Santos Laguna) he was transferred to Guadalajara, one of the biggest clubs in Mexico. With this team, he lived his best displays on the field. This culminated in 1997, when he got the championship of the Mexican tournament. In 1998, he played another final with Guadalajara against Necaxa, but this time he lost. In 1999, after a lot of speculation and rumors, he was transferred against his will to America, the biggest rival of Guadalajara, a team where he was an idol to the fans. This caused a lot of controversy, since he was an emblematic player of his team.

This transfer to the rival club, caused him a lack of form, perhaps due to depression. This turned to be evident in a match between América and his former team, when he scored a goal: the moment was so shocking for him, that he didn't know how to react. Fortunately for him, that goal didn't count due to offside.

His lack of form ruled him out of América at the end of the Summer 1999 season. He was then, transferred to Tigres UANL. In this team, he had difficult times to recover; he wasn't even registered with his preferred number 7 (retired in honour to the peruvian player Gerónimo Barbadillo in 1982). He slowly found his form again, and this awarded him another call for Mexico national team. In the Winter 2001 season, he played again in the final of the Mexican tournament, but he lost again, this time against Pachuca. However, he played in this match as a substitute.

For the summer 2002 season, he returned to his beloved team Guadalajara. Constant injuries caused him to miss several matches, but again he displayed his talent, although irregularly. He reached the final of the Clausura 2004 season,  but lost on penalty kicks against Pumas UNAM. At the end of the Clausura 2004 season, he joined Chivas USA.

In Chivas USA he played the last part of his career, being the captain of the team. He retired from the fields in 2007.

Accident

On December 12, 2000, Ramírez, while driving at velocity well above the permitted speed limit, collided with another vehicle that left him injured for several months and killed an entire family of 5. Professor Efraín Cázarez Barbosa of 31 years old, his pregnant wife Evangelina Rodríguez Aceves of 29 years old, and their children Guillermo Efraín and Adonella Berenice Cázarez Rodríguez of 9 and 5 years old respectively, were killed in the collision. The professor's wife, Evangelina Rodríguez Aceves, was launched from the vehicle and hit the pavement where she was run over by another car. In February 2002, Ramírez was acquitted of charges of homicide.

International career

Ramírez received his first call-up to the senior national team in 1991 as a promising young talent, and after recovering from a tibia and fibula fracture in 1993, he played regularly for Mexico until 2000.

His first major appearance for Mexico, was in the Copa América 1993 in Ecuador; the Mexico coach then was Miguel Mejia Baron. Being left-footed, Ramirez was used by the coach as a left-back rather than as a left winger/playmaker, position he had at club level. The Mexican team reached the final, but lost 2–1 against Argentina.

Ramírez was again called to be part of the national team for the World Cup USA 1994, in which he continued playing as left back. The team reached the Round of 16, losing to Bulgaria in penalty kicks.

He also participated in the Copa América Uruguay 1995. The Mexico team performed poorly, and ended in 7th place of 12 teams. They tied to USA in quarter finals and were dismissed on penalty kicks. In 1997, he missed the Copa América in Bolivia.

In 1998, Ramírez returned to participate in the World Cup France 98. In this tournament, he had a more offensive role (the one he used to have in his club), giving one assist to Cuauhtémoc Blanco to score against Belgium. However, he was sent off in the match against Holland (after a confusion of the referee, who was supposed to book another player), so he was suspended to the Round of 16 match against Germany, which eventually was the last match of Mexico.

Ramírez scored 15 goals in 119 caps for his country.

Honours
Guadalajara
Mexican Primera División: Verano 1997

Mexico
FIFA Confederations Cup: 1999
CONCACAF Gold Cup: 1993, 1996, 1998

Career statistics

International goals

See also
List of football (soccer) players with 100 or more caps

References
International statistics at rsssf
Player Stats at Chivas USA site 
Player Bio (in Spanish) 

1969 births
Living people
Sportspeople from Tepic, Nayarit
Footballers from Nayarit
Chivas USA players
Santos Laguna footballers
Tigres UANL footballers
Club América footballers
C.D. Guadalajara footballers
Mexican expatriate footballers
Mexican footballers
Expatriate soccer players in the United States
Mexican expatriate sportspeople in the United States
1993 Copa América players
1994 FIFA World Cup players
1995 King Fahd Cup players
1995 Copa América players
1996 CONCACAF Gold Cup players
1997 FIFA Confederations Cup players
1998 CONCACAF Gold Cup players
1998 FIFA World Cup players
1999 Copa América players
1999 FIFA Confederations Cup players
2000 CONCACAF Gold Cup players
CONCACAF Gold Cup-winning players
FIFA Confederations Cup-winning players
Mexico international footballers
FIFA Century Club
Liga MX players
Major League Soccer players
Association football midfielders
1993 CONCACAF Gold Cup players